Group H of the 2010 FIFA World Cup began on 16 June and ended on 25 June 2010. The group consisted of Switzerland, Honduras, Chile and reigning European champions Spain. Spain would eventually win the tournament.

Chile and Spain were in the same group in 1950, in a group from which only the Spanish team qualified for the next round. Chile and Switzerland were also in the same group in 1962, when Chile was host and went on to finish in third place. Switzerland and Spain competed in the same group in 1966, but neither advanced to the next round. Finally, Honduras and Spain were in the same group in 1982. Four years later, in the next World Cup, Chile and Spain would meet again in Group B, against the Netherlands and Australia; Chile would upset Spain 2–0 in their second match, eliminating Spain from the tournament.

Standings

Spain advanced to play Portugal (runner-up of Group G) in the round of 16.
Chile advanced to play Brazil (winner of Group G) in the round of 16.
Switzerland would wind up being the first team since Norway in 1994 to defeat the group winner in their opening match but fail to advance to the second round.

Matches
All times local (UTC+2)

Honduras vs Chile

Spain vs Switzerland

Chile vs Switzerland

Spain vs Honduras

Chile vs Spain

Switzerland vs Honduras

References

Group H
Group
Chile at the 2010 FIFA World Cup
Switzerland at the 2010 FIFA World Cup
Group